Namkung Woong (born 29 March 1984) is a South Korean football player who currently is a free agent. He formerly played for Suwon Bluewings, Seongnam Ilhwa Chunma, Gangwon FC in the K League and Kedah FA as well as Perak FA in Malaysia Premier League.

On 5 February 2011, Seongnam Ilhwa Chunma was officially announced his signing. He joined his previous club, Perak FA in December 2014.

His brother Namkung Do is also a footballer.

Club career statistics

Malaysia League Performance

Honors
Seongnam Ilhwa Chunma

2011 FA Cup Winner
2015 Malaysian Super League all-star

References

External links

 FIFA Player Statistics

1984 births
Living people
Association football forwards
South Korean footballers
Suwon Samsung Bluewings players
Gimcheon Sangmu FC players
Seongnam FC players
Gangwon FC players
Kedah Darul Aman F.C. players
Perak F.C. players
K League 1 players
Footballers from Seoul
Hamyeol Namgung clan